Charles Wells Moulton (1859–1913) was an American poet, critic, editor, and publisher. He was the founding editor of The Magazine of Poetry and Literary Review, and the publisher of A Woman of the Century (1893).

1859 births
1913 deaths